Aetna Township is a township in Barber County, Kansas, USA. At the 2000 census, its population was 3.

Geography
According to the USGS, it contains one cemetery, Aetna.

The streams of Ash Creek, Big Sandy Creek, Deadman Creek, Dry Creek, East Dry Creek, Mule Creek and West Dry Creek run through this township.

References
 USGS Geographic Names Information System (GNIS)

External links
 City-Data.com

Townships in Barber County, Kansas
Townships in Kansas